Antitype is a genus of moths of the family Noctuidae. The genus was erected by Jacob Hübner in 1821.

The scientific name is derived from the Greek antitupos (something that returns). Hübner probably referred to similarities with a genus which was described earlier, probably Polymixis.

Species
 Antitype africana Berio, 1939
 Antitype armena (Eversmann, 1856)
 Antitype chi (Linnaeus, 1758) – grey chi
 Antitype chionodes Boursin, 1968
 Antitype jonis (Lederer, 1865)
 Antitype suda (Geyer, [1832])

Antitype kalchbergi is now known as Brachygalea kalchbergi (Staudinger, 1897).

References

 
Cuculliinae